Circuit of the Americas (COTA) is a Grade 1 FIA-specification  motor racing track and facilities located within the extraterritorial jurisdiction of Austin, Texas, in the United States. The facility is home to the Formula One United States Grand Prix, NASCAR's Texas Grand Prix, and the Motorcycle Grand Prix of the Americas, a round in MotoGP. It previously hosted the Australian V8 Supercars, the Americas Rallycross Championship, the American Le Mans Series, the Rolex Sports Car Series, the FIA World Endurance Championship, the IMSA WeatherTech SportsCar Championship and the IndyCar Classic. 

The circuit and Grand Prix were first proposed in the middle of 2010. The circuit was the first in the United States to be purpose-built for Formula One. The layout was conceived by promoter Tavo Hellmund and 1993 Motorcycle World Champion Kevin Schwantz with the assistance of German architect and circuit designer Hermann Tilke, who has also designed the Sepang, Shanghai, Yas Marina, Istanbul, Bahrain, Yeongam, and Buddh circuits, as well as the reprofiling of the Hockenheimring and Fuji Speedway.

History

Construction

The majority of the site had been planned to be developed into a residential subdivision called "Wandering Creek". In the same news conference, Hellmund also revealed that Texas billionaire Red McCombs was the project's largest investor. 
The circuit homologation design was submitted to the FIA in Geneva for approval on December 17, 2010. HKS, Inc. and Tilke Engineers & Architects designed the track, and Austin Commercial, a subsidiary of Austin Industries, was the general contractor. Construction began on December 31, 2010, and was due to be complete by June 2012. Following a stop-work order in December 2011, the completion date was revised to August. The first tasks were building the silt fences, taking core samples, and shredding existing vegetation.

On January 21, 2011, a $900,000 check was posted with Travis County that permitted grading to begin. The money was to be used to restore the land if the U.S. Federal Emergency Management Agency (FEMA) declined to allow the project to move forward because part of the site lies in a floodplain. FEMA issued a letter on June 28, 2011, stating the project meets its floodplain management criteria.

In January 2012, Travis County announced that Elroy Road—one of the two primary public access roads to the circuit—would receive an upgrade to handle the increased volume of incoming traffic, but not before the running of the 2012 race. At the time of the announcement, the unstable clay soils under the road surface had caused Elroy Road to gradually buckle and shift, necessitating the upgrade.

On June 13, 2012, Charlie Whiting—the FIA-appointed Race Director for Formula One—declared himself satisfied with the circuit's construction, scheduling a final pre-race inspection of the circuit for September 25, sixty days before the first race, which the circuit later passed. To ensure the demanding FIA specifications for the track were met, GPS-based 3D paving equipment was used on the asphalt paving and milling machines. The first layer of asphalt was completed on August 3, 2012. Construction began laying the final layer of asphalt on August 14, and was finished on September 21. The track was officially opened on October 21, with Mario Andretti running the ceremonial first laps in a Lotus 79, the car he drove when he became the last American to win the World Drivers' Championship in 1978. The Grand Plaza, Observation Structure, Tower Amphitheater, and Main Grandstand were designed by Austin-based architectural firm Miró Rivera Architects.

Name
McCombs wished to call the site "Speed City", but the owners originally anticipated selling the naming rights to various parts of the facility for $7 million. On April 12, 2011, the track's name was announced as "Circuit of the Americas" at a press conference. Red McCombs, later said: “One of the most inviting aspects of the name is the word ‘Americas’. It reflects Austin's ideal location at the crossroads of North America from north to south, east to west. Also, it speaks to our state as a centre of commerce and cultural exchange in this hemisphere. I look forward to meeting many fans and visitors who will be coming from every country.” In December 2020 Red McCombs got a corner named after him called 'Big Red'.

City endorsement and lawsuit
In order for the race to take place, the Austin city council was asked to be the sponsoring municipality for the event. Through being a sponsor, the city could apply for money from a state fund, the Major Events Trust Fund (METF), designed to attract major sporting events to Texas that would be used to pay the Formula One race sanctioning fee. This matter was complicated by opponents of the project who filed a lawsuit against state comptroller Susan Combs, claiming that she had promised the funding to the circuit without having been legally authorized to do so, though promoters have responded stating that all necessary guidelines had been followed. 

In June 2011, the Austin city council agreed to allow the circuit to apply to the Texas Major Events Trust Fund but withheld its full endorsement requiring the circuit to pay the financial match normally borne by the local government sponsor.  As a part of the endorsement, the sport will pay $15,000 in carbon offsets and $5 million to establish an on-site research project into environmentally friendly technologies.

On July 1, 2011, a state district court judge declined to enter a temporary restraining order against Combs preventing payments from the METF; nonetheless, Texas Comptroller Combs reconsidered and chose not to make the July 31 advance payment to FOMC/Bernard Ecclestone as previously agreed for the first year's sanctioning fee. The attorney for the project's opponents has stated that he is unsure if they will continue pursuing the lawsuit.

Breach of contract and reinstatement

In November 2011, Bernie Ecclestone expressed what he called "minor" doubt over the future of the United States Grand Prix in Austin after "disagreements inside the [management] company". These issues were later confirmed when construction of the circuit came to a halt because of a dispute between the circuit owners, promoter Full Throttle Productions, and Formula One Management. 

Promoter Tavo Hellmund admitted that his company had been in breach of its contract with Formula One Management since May 2011. The situation further escalated when state comptroller Susan Combs described the planned Grand Prix of America as a threat to the race in Texas, and said that the first $25 million payment from the state sports fund would only be made available after the first Grand Prix at the circuit, despite having previously promised to make the funds available in time for the inaugural event. Bernie Ecclestone later issued an ultimatum to the owners and organizers: find a solution before the December 7 meeting of the FIA World Motor Sport Council or else risk being removed from the 2012 calendar. Ecclestone emphasized that if the Circuit of the Americas were removed from the calendar, it would not be added again at a later date.

On December 7, 2011, the World Motor Sport Council released the final calendar for the 2012 season, with the Circuit of the Americas retaining its November 18 date. Further details revealed that the race investors, McCombs and Epstein, had reached a new arrangement with Ecclestone, with work on the circuit scheduled to resume immediately. As a part of the arrangement, organizers paid the sanctioning fee for the 2012 race one year in advance as a show of good faith. At the time of the circuit's reinstatement, there were no reports supporting Tavo Hellmund's continued involvement under the new contract. 

On March 4, 2012, The Austin American-Statesman reported that Hellmund had launched legal proceedings against investors Bobby Epstein and Red McCombs, with Hellmund claiming that he was still a part of the management company and had not been paid since September. Further details emerged, reporting that Hellmund was in the process of attempting to acquire Epstein's interest in the company, describing the condition of the circuit as of March 4 as "teetering". Epstein responded to the lawsuit by stating that Hellmund had been found to have been in breach of contract by Formula One Management. In June 2012, the dispute between Hellmund and Epstein was reported to have been settled out of court.

Formula One attendance records
A crowd of 117,429 spectators watched the United States Grand Prix in November 2012 after four years of Formula One not hosting a Grand Prix in the United States. In October 2022, the three-day Formula One United States Grand Prix event drew a record number of fans. Roughly 440,000 people attended the event, breaking Formula One's attendance record of 400,000 set at the 2021 United States Grand Prix for an event held in North America. Sunday's race final drew over 150,000 spectators to Circuit of the Americas breaking the inaugural Formula One race at the circuit attendance in 2012. This surge was due to the popularity of Formula 1: Drive to Survive in the United States and the honoring of the 2020 tickets as the 2020 United States Grand Prix was cancelled due to the COVID-19 pandemic.

Dispute over planned MotoGP race

In April 2011, plans were unveiled by Tavo Hellmund of Full Throttle Productions and Kevin Schwantz of 3fourTexas for the circuit to host a round of the 2013 MotoGP World Championship, with the race to be known as the Texas Grand Prix. The race was the brainchild of Schwantz, the circuit co-designer, who would serve as event promoter with his company, 3fourTexas. However, following the settlement of the lawsuit between Tavo Hellmund and Bobby Epstein, Schwantz announced that he would be suing Steve Sexton. Schwantz claimed that upon the resolution of the dispute between Hellmund and Epstein, Sexton moved to negotiate directly with MotoGP's commercial rights holder, Dorna Sports, ignoring what he claimed was an existing contract between Dorna and 3fourTexas to hold the race. 

Circuit representatives denied that there was ever a contract between Schwantz and the Circuit of the Americas, and that his dispute was with Dorna Sports. Dorna later claimed that although a contract for the race between Dorna and Schwantz had existed, the contract had been terminated in July 2012 as they believed Schwantz had failed to acquire the necessary rights from the circuit to hold the race. Schwantz then accused Sexton and the Circuit of the Americas of "undermining" him, deliberately blocking his attempts to establish a race in order to have the contract terminated and allowing them to negotiate a more-favourable arrangement with Dorna.

In October 2012, Dorna Sports announced that they had come to agreeable terms with organizers of the Texas motorcycle Grand Prix, including the race on the 2013 calendar as the Motorcycle Grand Prix of the Americas, but made no mention of the dispute with Schwantz or any outcome of it. Prior to the 2014 Motorcycle Grand Prix of the Americas, the circuit announced that COTA and Schwantz had amicably settled their legal differences and reached an agreement to collaborate to promote motorcycling racing, with Schwantz taking the role as official ambassador for COTA.

IndyCar Series

On September 4, 2018, IndyCar announced that it has reached a multi-year agreement to add the Circuit of the Americas to its calendar replacing Phoenix Raceway (then known as ISM Raceway), finalizing the IndyCar Series calendar. After hosting an IndyCar Spring Training test session, on February 12–13, COTA made its debut on the IndyCar Series schedule on Sunday, March 24, serving as the second race of the 2019 campaign, with the AutoNation IndyCar Challenge (IndyCar Classic), following the March 10 season-opener at St. Petersburg, FL. It was the first time since 2014 that two tracks in Texas would appear on the IndyCar Series calendar.

On February 11, 2020, (perhaps as a precursor of the season to come) the opening day of IndyCar Spring Training, cold temperatures and persistent showers severely limited track time for all competitors to slow installation laps and a few experimental runs on rain tires.  With improved weather, on February 12, IndyCar concluded its first open test of the season.  However, the 2020 race was cancelled due to the COVID-19 pandemic.  On October 1, 2020, Indycar released the 2021 calendar with COTA dropped from the schedule unexpectedly to the surprise of many, after it was announced two years prior that they had a multi year deal in place between Indycar and COTA.

NASCAR

On September 30, 2020, it was announced that COTA would host a NASCAR Cup Series event for the first time on May 23, 2021. The lower Xfinity and Camping World Truck Series were also added as support events. On December 11, 2020, it was announced that NASCAR would run the full  course. EchoPark Automotive assumed naming rights for the Cup race, which dubbed it the EchoPark Texas Grand Prix. The Xfinity and Truck races were respectively named the Pit Boss 250 and Toyota Tundra 225 with title sponsorship from Pit Boss Grills and Toyota.

The inaugural race weekend was marred by rain, with the Truck race on Saturday being in wet conditions while the Xfinity event later in the day was drier. The Cup race the following day, won by Chase Elliott, was shortened as the weather worsened and caused low driver visibility. On September 15, The Athletic has reported that NASCAR will return to the circuit for the 2022 season as Speedway Motorsports, the promoter of the race picked up the renewal on the contract. The race ran as scheduled on March 27, 2022. The promoters announced on the week prior to the race that NASCAR will be returning to Austin as they renewed for one more year. It will mark the third time consecutively that NASCAR goes to Austin.

Facilities

Racetrack

The final plan of the circuit was released on September 1, 2010, showing a design inspired by the European tradition of sculpting the circuit to the contours of the land. The design draws from several European Formula One circuits, including a recreation of Silverstone's Maggotts–Becketts–Chapel sequence, Hockenheim's arena bends, and a replica of Istanbul's Turn Eight. Other corners were loosely inspired by the Senna 'S' at Interlagos and the Österreichring's Sebring-Auspuffkurve. A feature of the circuit is a deliberate widening of corners, to encourage drivers to follow multiple racing lines. A similar feature was used at the Buddh International Circuit in India, where the circuit widens on the approach to certain corners.

The circuit was one of only a handful on the Formula One 2012 calendar to be run counter-clockwise, the others being Marina Bay, the Korea International Circuit, Yas Marina, and Interlagos. Because of this, the circuit contains more left-hand turns than right-hand ones, placing greater physical demands on the drivers whose bodies, particularly their necks, are more adapted to the lateral g-forces of clockwise circuits.

From the start line, the drivers climb a gradient of over 11% to the first corner—the highest point of the circuit—with the apex of the corner positioned on the crest of the hill. They descend the hill to navigate a series of fast sweepers modeled on Silverstone's Maggotts–Becketts–Chapel complex and through a blind corner at Turn 10, taking them to the far end of the circuit and a hairpin at Turn 11. The drivers then follow a  straight back towards the pit and paddock area before entering the final sector of the lap and weaving through a series of corners modeled on Hockenheim's stadium section. This is followed by a downhill, multi-apex corner with limited run-off before the final two corners of the circuit, a pair of left-hand bends that return the drivers to the main straight.

Reception
The reception from drivers ahead of the inaugural race was highly positive. Fernando Alonso and Lewis Hamilton both praised the circuit, suggesting that it would be considerably more difficult to learn than other recent additions to the Formula One calendar. Jenson Button described the first sector as "spectacular", but remarked that he felt that starting second would be better than starting first as the placement of pole position put it on a steeper incline than the rest of the grid. Kamui Kobayashi, on the other hand, was less complimentary, claiming that he did not feel intimidated by the steep climb to the first corner as it was no different from Eau Rouge at the Circuit de Spa-Francorchamps, and accusing the media of hyping it up without precedent. Mark Webber was also unimpressed, stating that while he enjoyed driving the first sector of the circuit, the second and third sectors were similar to other circuits on the calendar.

Grand Plaza

Bordered by the track on three sides, the Grand Plaza is a  space designed by Miró Rivera Architects of Austin, Texas that includes a large reflecting pool, lawn, and varying landscape zones. A promenade along the north side of the Grand Plaza hosts concessions, retail, restroom facilities, and entrances to spectator seating. From the southeast end of the Grand Plaza, two pedestrian bridges cross over turns 16 and 3 to provide access for visitors to other areas of the circuit complex.

Observation Tower

Circuit of the Americas features a  observation tower designed by Miró Rivera Architects and built by Patriot Erectors as a landmark for the venue. The platform provides a 360-degree panorama of the circuit, as well as views to downtown Austin, Texas. The observation platform, which is accessible to the public for an admission fee, can accommodate up to 70 visitors and features glass railings and a partial glass floor. In addition, a "veil" consisting of 18 bright red steel tubes runs nearly the full height of the tower, acting as a canopy for both the observation platform and the stage below. The design of the observation tower was inspired by the visual imagery of sports cars and movement, and the red color was selected to mimic the streaks of lights trailing racecars at night.

Germania Insurance Amphitheater

On July 23, 2012, COTA announced a booking agreement with Live Nation to book major concerts at an open air amphitheater to be built at the base of the observation tower. Designed by Miró Rivera Architects, the venue opened in April 2013 with a concert by Kenny Chesney.
The amphitheater accommodates up to 14,000 people with 5,240 permanent reserved seats. Another 1,700 seats can be configured on the stage-front floor or there is standing room for 2,300. The remaining general admission spots are on a sloping grass area behind the reserved seats. The venue was originally going to be called Tower Amphitheater, but under a deal closed in March 2013, was renamed to Austin360 Amphitheater, with naming rights sold to the entertainment/events website associated with the Austin American-Statesman. Beginning January 1, 2020, COTA renamed the venue the Germania Insurance Amphitheater under a seven-year deal with the Brenham, Texas based insurance company.

Main Grandstand
The primary permanent seating at Circuit of the Americas is located within the Main Grandstand, designed by Miró Rivera Architects. Above-ground construction on the grandstand began in March 2012, and the "topping out" occurred in June 2012 with completion in time for the inaugural United States Grand Prix.

The seating is divided into three levels: lower level (capacity ~5400, including Loge Boxes), club level (capacity ~2900), and suite level (capacity ~750). The majority of seating is covered by a tensile fabric canopy. The grandstand also contains concessions, restrooms, offices, and two lounge spaces located at the second and third levels.

Both the Main Grandstand and the concessions buildings in the Grand Plaza were conceived as a modular system consisting of several components that can be arranged according to need. The concessions, with banners and deep canopies, can be expanded with restrooms, permanent seating or suites. Inherent to this “kit-of-parts” construction system is flexibility allowing the site to grow and change.

Bold Stadium

In August 2017, a new soccer-specific stadium was announced to be built between the Amphitheater and the Grand Plaza. A professional soccer team known as Austin Bold FC began playing in the USL Championship in 2019 until 2021. The stadium seats 5,000 people. The Austin Gilgronis of Major League Rugby was playing home games at the stadium in 2020.

Record lap times
Official record lap times are only set during the race. The fastest ever lap on the track is 1:32.029 set by Valtteri Bottas in a Mercedes AMG F1 W10 EQ Power+ during qualifying at the 2019 United States Grand Prix. The official race lap records at the COTA are listed as:

Events

Current events
 February: Sports Car Club of America
 March: NASCAR Cup Series Texas Grand Prix, NASCAR Xfinity Series Pit Boss 250, NASCAR Craftsman Truck Series XPEL 225
 April: Grand Prix motorcycle racing Motorcycle Grand Prix of the Americas, Ferrari Challenge North America, North America Talent Cup
 May: GT World Challenge America, GT America Series, GT4 America Series, TC America Series, Gazoo Racing Cup North America
 August: Porsche Sprint Challenge North America, USF Pro 2000 Championship, USF Juniors
 September: MotoAmerica Championship of Texas
 October: Formula One United States Grand Prix, F1 Academy, Masters Racing Legends
 November: Trans-Am Series Austin SpeedTour, Formula Regional Americas Championship, Formula 4 United States Championship, Sportscar Vintage Racing Association

Minor events
The circuit as of 2022 hosts minor completions like the Formula Regional Americas Championship, Formula 4 United States Championship and the Ferrari Challenge North America.

Former events
The track has hosted various events like the IMSA WeatherTech SportsCar Championship, INDYCAR and the X Games.

Cancelled events
COTA would have hosted the inaugural Intercontinental GT Challenge and the AutoNation INDYCAR Challenge.

Notes

References

External links

 Circuit of the Americas – Official website
 United States Grand Prix – Official website
 Grand Prix of the Americas - Official website
 Championship of Texas - Official website
 Texas Grand Prix - Official website
 Austin Speedtour - Official website
 Race Track Guide
 Miró Rivera Architects.
 Circuit of the Americas Seating Charts
 Circuit of the Americas on Google Maps (Current Formula 1 Tracks)
 Circuit of the Americas circuit guide

Circuit of the Americas
Formula One circuits
Grand Prix motorcycle circuits
NASCAR tracks
IndyCar Series tracks
IMSA GT Championship circuits
American Le Mans Series circuits
World Rallycross circuits
Major League Rugby stadiums
Motorsport venues in Texas
Racing circuits designed by Hermann Tilke
Sports venues in Austin, Texas
Buildings and structures in Travis County, Texas
United States Grand Prix
Austin Gilgronis
Rugby union stadiums in Texas
Tourist attractions in Travis County, Texas
Sports venues completed in 2012
2012 establishments in Texas